Chow Ho-Wan (born 15 April 1982 in Hong Kong) is a Hong Kong racing rider. He has competed in the 250cc and 125cc World Championships, the Asian Road Racing Championship and the Chinese Superbike Championship. He is also the 2008 China Superbike Championship 600cc champion.

Macau ACMC Trophy
Chow Ho-Wan was a regular competitor in the now defunct ACMC Trophy motorcycle race, for 125cc motorbikes, part of the Macau Grand Prix.
In 2000, Chow Ho-Wan qualified 5th on a Honda RS125 and finished 4th.
In 2001, Chow Ho-Wan qualified 12th on a Yamaha TZ125 but failed to finish the race.
In 2002, Chow Ho-Wan qualified fourth and finished third.
In 2003, the last time the race was held, he qualified third and finished second on a Honda RS125 ... ...

Career statistics

By season

Races by year
(key)

References

1. https://web.archive.org/web/20110728022928/http://gp.macau.grandprix.gov.mo/mgpc/public_html/gp50/cn/index.php?cat=result&race=ACMC_RACE.csv#view

update by 15 November 2003

2. https://web.archive.org/web/20160305003504/http://www.zic.com.cn/event_info.php?id=896

update by 2013/09/15

3. http://www.motogp.com/en/videos/2007/HO+WAN+CHOW+during+QP2

Saturday, 15 September 2007

4. http://www.motogp.com/en/videos/2008/Ho+Wan+Chow+crash+in+Sachsenring+QP

update by Friday, 11 July 2008

5. http://www.motogp.com/en/news/2006/Kallio+on+provisional+pole+in+125cc

update by Friday, 12 May 2006

6. http://www.motogp.com/en/news/2005/Historic+presence+of+Chinese+riders+at+ShanghaiWednesday

update by 27 April 2005Historic presence of Chinese riders at Shanghai

7. https://web.archive.org/web/20160304001137/http://www.pic-taiwan.com/event_detail.php?id=142
update by 20 August 2013

External links
Rider record at MotoGP.com
Rider record at CSBK.com

250cc World Championship riders
125cc World Championship riders
Chinese motorcycle racers
Hong Kong people
1982 births
Living people
Hong Kong motorsport people
FIM Superstock 1000 Cup riders